Local elections were held in Sri Lanka on 29 January 1998 for 17 local authorities on the Jaffna peninsula, in the north of the country. They were the first local elections held in the peninsula since 1983. Turnout was low due to the threats issued by the rebel Tamil Tigers. The Eelam People's Democratic Party gained control of nine local authorities, Democratic People's Liberation Front (PLOTE) three, Tamil United Liberation Front one and Tamil Eelam Liberation Organization one. There was no overall control in the three remaining local authorities.

Background
The Sri Lankan government suspended local government in the north and east of the country in 1983 using Emergency Regulations. In March 1994, elections were held in the east and in Vavuniya in the north. However, elections weren't held in other areas of the north, including the Jaffna peninsula, because most of these areas were at that time controlled by the rebel Tamil Tigers.

In August 1995 the Sri Lankan Military launched an offensive to recapture the Jaffna peninsula. By December 1995 the military had captured most of the Valikamam region of the peninsula, including the city of Jaffna. By 16 May 1996 the military had recaptured the entire peninsula. In late 1996 the government announced elections would be held for 23 local authorities in Jaffna District, Kilinochchi District, Mannar District and Vavuniya District but following opposition from Tamil political parties postponed them. On 3 December 1997 the government announced that elections would be held for the 17 local authorities on the Jaffna peninsula. The Tamil political parties were still opposed to holding elections as "normalcy" hadn't returned to the peninsula. The peninsula was under the firm grip of the Sri Lankan military and civil government had little, if any, role in the administration of the peninsula. The Tamil Tigers were also firmly against the elections being held. Despite these objections the elections were held on 29 January 1998.

Details
The Tamil Tigers ordered the electors not to participate in the elections and issued threats against election officials and potential candidates. As a result, most moderate political parties did not participate in the elections. The two main national parties, People's Alliance and United National Party, didn't contest in any of the local authorities. The Tamil United Liberation Front, the largest moderate Tamil party, only contested in two of the 17 local authorities. This allowed the elections to be dominated by government backed paramilitary groups and rebel militant groups. The Democratic People's Liberation Front (PLOTE), Eelam People's Democratic Party, Eelam People's Revolutionary Liberation Front and Tamil Eelam Liberation Organization contested in all 17 local authorities. A breakaway faction of the EPDP contested in two local authorities as an independent group.

Five of the nominations of the EPRLF and both nominations of the TULF were initially rejected due to technical errors but legal challenges overturned the rejections.

Results
Turnout was low (19%) due to the threats issued by the Tamil Tigers. 14% of the votes cast were also spoilt. The EPDP gained control of nine local authorities, DPLF (PLOTE) three, TULF one and TELO one. There was no overall control in the three remaining local authorities, including Jaffna Municipal Council.

Overall

By local authority

1. DC = Rural Council (Pradeshiya Sabha or Pradesha Sabhai), MC = Municipal Council, UC = Urban Council

Aftermath
The normal life term of Sri Lankan local government bodies is four years. The life term of the above 17 local authorities expired in February 2002 but the central government extended this by another year, as the law allows. Elections should have been held when the extension expired in February 2003 but in January 2003, following a request from the Tamil National Alliance, the central government instead dissolved the local authorities and instead put in place special commissions to administer the local areas.

The Jaffna peninsula continued to be administered by these special commissions until elections were held on 8 August 2009 for Jaffna Municipal Council. Elections for the rest of the peninsula are due to take place on 17 March 2011.

References
 
 

1998 elections in Asia
1998 in Sri Lanka
January 1998 events in Asia
1998